The Indonesian speckled carpetshark, Hemiscyllium freycineti, is a species of bamboo shark in the family Hemiscylliidae. It is found in the shallow ocean around the Raja Ampat Islands in West Papua, Indonesia, but was formerly believed to be more widespread. This was due to confusion with H. michaeli, a species described from eastern Papua New Guinea in 2010. Compared to that species, the spots on H. freycineti are smaller, more rounded or slightly elongated in shape (versus relatively large, edged and more leopard-like in H. michaeli), and tend to darken at regular intervals forming 8-9 vertical bars on the body and tail. Furthermore, the large black spot behind the pectoral fin is more clearly defined in H. michaeli than in H. freycineti. Confusingly, some books with illustrations and photos labelled as H. freycineti actually show H. michaeli.

It is nocturnal, hiding in reef crevices during the day.

Etymology
The shark is named in honor of French navigator Louis de Freycinet (1779-1841), who collected the type specimen.

See also

 List of sharks
 Carpet shark

References

Indonesian speckled carpetshark
Fish of Indonesia
Fish of Western New Guinea
Taxa named by Jean René Constant Quoy - 1824-1825
Taxa named by Joseph Paul Gaimard
Indonesian speckled carpetshark